Elina "Gunner" Kallionidou (born Nov 18, 1998) is a Greek female mixed martial artist who competes in the Flyweight division of the Bellator MMA. Elina is a Former Cage Survivor Bantamweight Champion and have Brazilian Jiu-Jitsu blue belt.

Background 
She started MMA after being shown wrestling by a teacher and as a form of self-defence at the age of 14, before balancing school and a professional career, making her MMA debut at the age of 16. The athlete of ‘Armagos Gym’, with coaches in her corner Costa and Giorgos Armagos, has brought for Greece the first victory in the promotion.

Mixed martial arts career

Bellator MMA 
Kallionidou made her MMA debut at the age of 16, winning all her first bout and beating much more experienced opponents, winning the CS Women's Bantamweight title in the process.

Making her Bellator debut against Sinead Kavanagh at Bellator 169 on December 16, 2016; she lost the bout by unanimous decision. 

In her sophomore performance, she faced Anastasia Yankova on April 8, 2017 at Bellator 176, losing the bout via unanimous decision.

After her two losses in Bellator as a teenager, Kallionidou finished her next two opponents since leaving in 2017, submitting Barbara Nalepka via bulldog choke at Ladies Fight Night 8, and knocking out future UFC fighter Qihui Yan in the third round at WKG & M-1 Challenge 100. These performances led her to resigning with Bellator.

In her return performance, Kallionidou face Bruna Ellen on July 12, 2019 at Bellator 224, losing the bout in which she broke her hand via unanimous decision.

Kallionidou faced Bec Rawlings on 22 February 2020 at Bellator 240, losing the bout via unanimous decision.

After a year and half layoff, Kallionidou made her return against Petra Částková on October 1, 2021 at Bellator 267, submitting her opponent via heel hook in the first round.

Kallionidou faced Kate Jackson on May 13, 2022 at Bellator 281. She won the bout via TKO stoppage due to ground and pound at the end of the second round.

Kallionidou faced Jena Bishop on February 25, 2023 at Bellator 291. She lost the bout by unanimous decision.

Championships and accomplishments

Mixed martial arts 

 CageSurvivor
 CS Women's Bantamweight Championship (One time)

Mixed martial arts record

|-
|Loss
|align=center|9–5
|Jena Bishop
|Decision (unanimous)
|Bellator 291
|
|align=center|3
|align=center|5:00
|Dublin, Ireland
|
|-
|Win
|align=center|9–4
|Kate Jackson
|TKO (punches)
|Bellator 281
|
|align=center|2
|align=center|4:53
|London, England
|
|-
| Win
| align=center|8–4
| Petra Částková
| Submission (heel hook)
| Bellator 267
| 
| align=center|1
| align=center|2:07
| London, England
| 
|-
| Loss
| align=center|7–4
| Bec Rawlings
| Decision (unanimous)
| Bellator 240
| 
| align=center|3
| align=center|5:00
| Dublin, Ireland
| 
|-
| Loss
| align=center|7–3
| Bruna Ellen
| Decision (unanimous)
| Bellator 224
| 
| align=center|3
| align=center|5:00
| Thackerville, Oklahoma, United States
| 
|-
| Win
| align=center| 7–2
| Qihui Yan
| TKO (punches)
| WKG & M-1 Challenge 100
| 
| align=center| 3
| align=center| 0:21
| Harbin, China
| 
|-
| Win
| align=center| 6–2
| Barbara Nalepka
| Submission (bulldog choke)
| Ladies Fight Night 8
| 
| align=center| 2
| align=center| 1:18
| Łódź, Poland
|
|-
| Loss
| align=center| 5–2
| Anastasia Yankova
| Decision (unanimous)
| Bellator 176
| 
| align=center|3
| align=center|5:00
| Torino, Italy
|
|-
| Loss
| align=center|5–1
| Sinead Kavanagh
| Decision (unanimous)
| Bellator 169
| 
| align=center|3
| align=center|5:00
| Dublin, Ireland
|
|-
| Win
| align=center| 5–0
| Dora Kalpakidou
| TKO (retirement)
| Cage Survivor 5
| 
| align=center|1
| align=center|5:00
| Athens, Greece
|
|-
| Win
| align=center| 4–0
| Foteini Kromida
| Decision (unanimous)
| rowspan=2|Cage Survivor 4
| rowspan=2| 
| align=center| 5
| align=center| 5:00
| rowspan=2| Athens, Greece
|
|-
| Win
| align=center|3–0
| Roxane Teixeira
| Decision (unanimous)
| align=center|3
| align=center|5:00
| 
|-
| Win
| align=center| 2–0
| Gianna Mpounia
| TKO (punches)
| Cage Survivor 3
| 
| align=center|2
| align=center|3:17
| Athens, Greece
|
|-
| Win
| align=center|1–0
| Despina Panagiotara
| TKO (punches)
| EFL 3
| 
| align=center|1
| align=center|4:00
| Athens, Greece
|

See also
 List of current Bellator fighters
 List of female mixed martial artists

References

External links
 
 

1998 births
People from Preveza
Living people
Bellator MMA champions
Bellator female fighters
Greek female mixed martial artists
Mixed martial artists utilizing Brazilian jiu-jitsu
Greek practitioners of Brazilian jiu-jitsu
Female Brazilian jiu-jitsu practitioners